Thomas Child (died 1413) was a mercer and the member of the Parliament of England for Salisbury for the parliament of 1407. He was also reeve and constable of Salisbury.

References 

Members of Parliament for Salisbury
English MPs 1407
Year of birth unknown
Reeves (England)
Mercers
1413 deaths